Geiringer is a surname. Notable people with the surname include:

Claudia Geiringer (born 1968), New Zealand professor of law
Elfriede Geiringer (1905–1998), Austrian Jewish survivor of the Second World War
Erich Geiringer (1917–1995), New Zealand writer, publisher, broadcaster, and a leading member of International Physicians for the Prevention of Nuclear War
Eva Geiringer Schloss (born 1929), Austrian Jewish survivor of the Second World War
Hilda Geiringer (1893–1973), Austrian mathematician
Karl Geiringer (1899–1989), Austrian American musicologist, educator and biographer of composers

References